Gumbetovsky District is an administrative and municipal district (raion), one of the forty-one in the Republic of Dagestan, Russia. It is located in the west of the republic. Its administrative center is the rural locality (a selo) of Mekhelta. As of the 2010 Census, the total population of the district was 22,046, with the population of Mekhelta accounting for 15.0% of that number.

Administrative and municipal status
Within the framework of administrative divisions, Gumbetovsky District is one of the forty-one in the Republic of Dagestan. The district is divided into six selsoviets which comprise twenty-seven rural localities. As a municipal division, the district is incorporated as Gumbetovsky Municipal District. Its six selsoviets are incorporated as fifteen rural settlements within the municipal district. The selo of Mekhelta serves as the administrative center of both the administrative and municipal district.

References

Notes

Sources

Districts of Dagestan
